Karnameye Balkh or Karname-ye Balkh (title means workbook of Balkh) is one of the works of Sanai and it contain his poet's composed when he stop in Balkh city. It is about five hundred verses and because it was written through some jokes, it has also been called the Humor letter (Motayebe Nameh).

In this work, the poet deals with some aspects of his life and his father and some of his contemporaries. This work has been corrected and published by Mohammad Taghi Modarres Razavi in Persian.

See also
 Hadiqat al Haqiqa
 Seir al-Ebad elal-Ma'ad
 Tariq ut-tahqiq
 Karname-ye Ardeshir-e Babakan
 Matigan-i Hazar Datistan
 Sheikh San'Aan

References

External links
 SANĀʾI on iranicaonline
 Sanai's books on Goodreads
 Hakim Sanai Poems

Sanai works